The 2015 Waterford Senior Hurling Championship was the 115th staging of the Waterford Senior Hurling Championship since its establishment by the Waterford County Board in 1887. The championship began on 8 May 2015 and ended on 18 October 2015.

Ballygunner were the defending champions. Affane Cappoquin entered as a promoted team from the intermediate championship.

On 18 October 2015, Ballygunner won the championship following a 0-16 to 0-12 defeat of Tallow in the final. This was their 14th championship title, their second in succession.

Lismore were relegated following a 1-18 to 1-12 defeat by De La Salle.

Results

Group 1

Group 2

Relegation play-off

Quarter-finals

Semi-finals

Final

External links

 2015 Waterford Senior Hurling Championship fixtures/results

References

Waterford Senior Hurling Championship
Waterford Senior Hurling Championship